This is a list of compositions by contemporary English composer John Woolrich (born 1954).

Brass and wind 
 Call to the Mirrors (2014)
 Fanfare (1994)
 Sennets and Tuckets (1998)

Chamber ensemble 
 A Book of Studies sets I  and II (1993)
 A Cabinet of Curiosities (1993)
 A door just opened on a street (from A Book of Inventions)
 A Dramolet, for clarinet, cello and piano (2008)
 A Farewell, for clarinet, viola and piano (1992)
 A Leap in the Dark (1994)
 A Parcel of Airs (from A Book of Inventions)
 A Presence of Departed Acts, for clarinet, violin, cello and piano (2002)
 A Shadowed Lesson (1993)
 A Short Story (from A Book of Inventions)
 A Still Tragic Dance (from A Book of Inventions)
 Adagissimo, for piano quartet (1997)
 After the Clock (1989)
 Another Journey Calls (from A Book of Inventions)
 Badinerie (from A Book of Inventions)
 Caprichos (1997)
 Contredanse (1991)
 Cutting a Caper  (2001)
 Dartington Doubles  (1988)
 Debricollage (from A Book of Inventions)
 Disparition (from A Book of Inventions)
 Duendecitos (from A Book of Inventions)
 Ending Up (from A Book of Inventions)
 Envoi, for viola and small ensemble (1997)
 Exploit in White, for brass quintet (2001)
 Fantazia, for viol consort (1994)
 Favola in Musica I, for oboe, clarinet and piano  (1990)
 Favola in Musica II, for oboe, soprano saxophone and percussion (1992)
 From the Book of Disquiet (2005)
 From the Shadow (1994)
 Going a Journey (2006)
 In the Mirrors of Asleep (2007)
 In the Stones, for string quartet (2004)
 Kleine Wanderung (from A Book of Inventions)
 Leaving Home, for oboe quintet (2003)
 Lending Wings (1989)
 Morendo (from A Book of Inventions)
 Music from a House of Crossed Desires (1996)
 My Box of Phantoms, for oboe quartet (1998)
 Oboe Quintet (1998)
 Pluck from the Air, for piano quintet (2013)
 Quick Steps (1990)
 Quiddities (2005)
 Scamander (from A Book of Inventions)
 Scherzi di Fantasia (from A Book of Inventions)
 Sestina, for piano quartet (1997)
 Songs and Broken Music (1993)
 Spalanzani's Daughter (1983)
 Stealing a March (2000)
 Stone Dances (1980)
 String Quartet No. 1 (1995)
 String Quartet No. 2 (2000)
 String Trio (1996)
 Suite from Bitter Fruit (2002)
 Swan Song (2015)
 The Death of King Renaud, for string quintet (1991)
 The Devil in the Clock (2012)
 The Iron Cockerel Sings (1998)
 The Lost Day of Return (2004)
 The Night will not draw on, for piano trio (2008)
 The path is winding (from A Book of Inventions)
 The Turkish Mouse, for oboe and piano (1988)
 The Voices of Dust (from A Book of Inventions)
 The Way Out Discovered (1997)
 Three Arias for Oboe and Six Viols (2001)
 Three Fantasias for Six Viols (2001)
 Totentanz (from A Book of Inventions)
 Toward the Black Sky, for piano trio (1997)
 Unweaving (from A Book of Inventions)
 Villanesca (from A Book of Inventions)
 Watermark, for violin and bass clarinet (2002)
 Zibaldone (from A Book of Inventions)

Chamber orchestra 
 A Curtain Tune (1996)
 Arcangelo (2002)
 Between the Hammer and the Anvil (2008)
 Cantilena (1997)
 Come and Go (2005)
 Concerto for Orchestra (1999)
 Speed the Going (1998)
 Through paths and turnings (2013)

Choral 
 A Book of Elegies (1996)
 A Quality of Loss (2014)
 A world is growing green (2016)
 Earth Grown Old (2003)
 Far from Home (1993)
 Little Walserings (1999)
 Over the Sea (1993)
 Paradise (2000)
 Spring in Winter (2001)
 That saying goodbye at the edge of the dark (2016)
 The Old Year (1999)
 The Rolling Years (2000)
 This Change (2003)
 Three Choruses (1998)

Instrumental 
 A Sort of Heaven, for violin and piano (2013)
 Darker Still, for flute and piano (2002)
 Dum Spiro, Spero, for accordion (2001)
 Elegy, for cello and piano (2001)
 Four Pieces for Cello and Piano (1994)
 Im Ruhigen Tal, for violin and piano (1993)
 Keepsake, for solo cor anglais (2000)
 Locus Solus, for piano (1998)
 Ostinato, for piano (2019)
 Pianobooks I-XV (1991–2016)
 ....that is Night, for violin and piano (1995)
 The Kingdom of Dreams, for oboe and piano (1989)
 The wakeful Night, for clarinet in A (2019)
 Three Capriccios for Oboe (2001)
 Three Pieces for Viola (1993)
 Three Pieces for Violin (2001)
 Through a Limbeck, for solo viola (2002)
 ....with land in Sight, for solo cello (1994)

Music theatre 
 Bitter Fruit (1999–2000)

Orchestral 
 A Capriccio to Calliope Herself (2000)
 A Litany, for oboe and strings (1998–99)
 Accord (1999)
 Concerto for Cello (1998)
 Concerto for Oboe (1996)
 Concerto for Viola (1993)
 Concerto for Violin (2008)
 Falling Down, for double bassoon and orchestra  (2009)
 Fanfarronada (2002)
 Si Va Facendo Notte, for clarinet and strings (1992)
 Tales of Transformation (2004)
 The Barber's Timepiece (1986)
 The Elephant from Celebes (2005)
 The Ghost in the Machine (1990)
 The Street of Crocodiles, for piano, trumpet and strings (2005)
 The Theatre Represents a Garden: Night (1991)
 The Tongs and the Bones (2014)
 Whitel's Ey (2008)

String orchestra 
 Another Staircase Overture (1994)
 Blue Drowning (2005)
 Capriccio (2009)
 Italian Songs (2009)
 It is Midnight, Dr Schweitzer (1992)
 To the Silver Bow, for viola, bass and strings (2014)
 Ulysses Awakes (1989)
 Variation on 'Sellinger's Round' (2013)

Vocal 
 A Paper of Black Lines (2008)
 A Singing Sky (2009)
 Ariadne Laments (1994)
 Berceuse (1990)
 Black Riddle (1984)
 Cascades (1983)
 Five Italian Songs (1984)
 Four Concert Arias (1994)
 Four Songs after Hoffmann (1981)
 Good Morning – Midnight (2002)
 Harlequinade (1983)
 Here is My Country (1995)
 La Cantarina (1989)
 Light and Rock (1988)
 Malicious Observer (1995–96)
 Ophelia Songs (1988)
 Serbian Songs (1988)
 The Sea and its Shore (2004)
 The Unlit Suburbs (1998)
 The Voices (2014)
 Three Cautionary Tales (1990–94)
 Three Macedonian Songs (1984)
 Three Purcell Songs, arranged for high voice and strings
 Three Songs for alto and six viols (2001)
 Three Songs for mezzo and strings (2003)
 To Witness her Goodbye (1995)
 Twisting that Lock (1997)

References 

Woolrich